The Bell 407 is a four-blade, single-engine, civil utility helicopter. A derivative of the Bell 206L-4 LongRanger, the 407 uses the four-blade, soft-in-plane design rotor with composite hub developed for the United States Army's OH-58D Kiowa Warrior instead of the two-blade, semi-rigid, teetering rotor of the 206L-4.

Design and development

In 1993, Bell began the development of the New Light Aircraft as a replacement for its Model 206 series. The program resulted in the 407, a development of Bell's LongRanger.  A 206L-3 LongRanger was modified to serve as the 407 demonstrator.  The demonstrator used hardware for the 407 and added molded fairings to represent the 407's wider fuselage then under development.

The demonstrator was first flown on April 21, 1994, and the 407 program was publicly announced at the Heli-Expo in Las Vegas, Nevada, in January 1995. The first 407 prototype (C-GFOS) accomplished its maiden flight on June 29, 1995, and the second prototype (C-FORS) followed on July 13, 1995. After a short development program, the first production 407 (C-FWQY/N407BT) flew on November 10, 1995.

The Bell 407 features the four-blade main rotor developed for the OH-58D (Model 406). The blades and hub use composite construction without life limits, and provide better performance and a more comfortable ride. The 407's fuselage is  wider, increasing internal cabin space, and includes 35% larger main cabin windows. The more powerful Rolls-Royce/Allison 250-C47 turboshaft allows an increase in Maximum Takeoff Weight and improves performance at hotter temperatures and/or higher altitudes.  The 407's airframe is generally similar to the LongRanger, but includes a carbon fiber composite tailboom.  The helicopter has standard seating for two crew and five cabin seats.

The 407 was certificated by Transport Canada on February 9, 1996, with the FAA following shortly after on February 23.  Full production began in 1996 at Bell's Mirabel, Quebec, Canada plant and produced 140 airframes in 1997, to fill the initial orders.

In 1995, Bell tested a shrouded tail rotor on the 407, but did not proceed with it. For a time, Bell studied developing the Model 407T twin-engine variant, but instead chose to develop the essentially all-new twin-PW206D powered Bell 427.

Bell began deliveries of the 407 in 1996.  The 1,000th helicopter was delivered on June 15, 2010.

ARH-70 and Bell 417
The ARH-70 armed reconnaissance helicopter, developed for the U.S. Army was based on the 407, but was later canceled on October 16, 2008.

The Bell 417 was a growth variant of the Bell 407, in essence a civil version of the Bell ARH-70. The 417 made its first flight on June 8, 2006. The 417 was to be powered by a Honeywell HTS900 turboshaft engine, producing  and includes full FADEC controls. The cabin sat five passengers in club-seating configuration, in addition to the crew of two. The civilian 417 was canceled at Heli-Expo 2007 in Orlando.

Bell 407GX and 407GT

On March 4, 2013, Bell unveiled a new armed version of the Bell 407GX, named the 407GT.  It incorporates the Garmin G1000HTM flight deck to easily provide flight information.  It can include infrared cameras, various armaments, and equipment to perform different missions such as armed transport, search-and-rescue, reconnaissance, and medical evacuation.  The GT version uses the universal weapons pylon (UWP), derived from the Bell OH-58 Kiowa, to carry different weapons including machine guns, rockets, and anti-armor missiles.

Operational history
Bell made delivery of the first production 407 at Heli-Expo, in Dallas, Texas in February 1996. Launch customers for the aircraft were Petroleum Helicopters International (PHI) , Niagara Helicopters, and Greenland Air.

On 23 May 2007, Colin Bodill and Jennifer Murray completed a record pole-to-pole around the world flight using a standard Bell 407. The flight originated from Bell's facility at the Fort Worth Alliance Airport on December 5, 2006. The project, named Polar First, was performed in partnership with the Royal Geographical Society to provide educational outreach to 28 international schools, which were visited during the trip. The project also served as a fundraiser for the SOS Children's Villages.

In 2009 the Iraqi Air Force ordered three Bell 407 armed scout helicopters (similar to the canceled ARH-70). A contract for 24 additional Bell 407s with an option for 26 more was awarded in April of that same year. The U.S. Army is managing modifications and installation of military equipment on the helicopters.  Three training T-407s were delivered to the Iraqi Army in 2010.  Armed IA-407s were delivered in eight batches of three aircraft from August 2012 to April 2013.  The final Bell 407 for Iraq was delivered on 3 April 2013. There are 30 in service; 24 armed scouts, three gunships, and three trainers.

Iraq is using the IA-407 in operations against Islamic State militants.  On October 8, 2014, militants shot down an IA-407 using a shoulder-fired ground-to-air missile, killing the pilot and co-pilot.

In December 2017, more than 1,400 were operating.

Variants

Bell 407 A civil utility helicopter, a derivative of the Bell 206L-4.

ARH-70 An upgraded 407 version to serve as an armed reconnaissance helicopter.

Bell 417 Planned civil version of the ARH-70, was canceled.

Bell 407 Light Observation Helicopter A military reconnaissance version.

Northrop Grumman MQ-8C Fire Scout An unmanned aerial vehicle (UAV) version being developed by Northrop Grumman and Bell Helicopter as a cargo resupply demonstrator. The test aircraft flew on 10 December 2010 at the Yuma Proving Ground. In February 2011, the US Navy's budget request for 2012 included funds to buy 12 Fire-X helicopters under the designation MQ-8C.

Bell 407AH An armed civil-certified version for use with government and security forces.

Bell 407GX Version of the 407 that features the new Garmin G1000 H-model glass cockpit along with improved avionics and improved flight controls.

Bell 407GT Armed version of the 407GX.

Bell 407GXPMarketing designation for the 407 with Rolls-Royce 250-C47B/8 engine and Garmin G1000H avionics.

Bell 407GXiMarketing designation for the 407 with Rolls-Royce 250-C47E/4 engine and Garmin G1000H NXi avionics.

Operators
The Bell 407 is in civil service around the world with airlines, corporations, hospitals, government operators, and private individuals.  It is also in service with several military operators.

Military

Bangladesh Army

Guatemalan Air Force

Iraqi Army

Jamaica Defence Force

Mexican Air Force

Nepalese Army Air Service

National Aeronaval Service

United Arab Emirates Air Force

Accidents
On June 4, 2022, Bell 407 GXP, N98ZA, was substantially damaged in an accident near Fairfield, New Jersey. The commercial pilot was seriously injured. Investigation by the US National Transportation Safety Board (NTSB) found that the tail rotor crosshead drive plate was not bolted to the tail rotor crosshead. The tail rotor had been installed the day before it was suspected that the bolts were not torqued.

On June 8, 2022 a Bell 407 had an inflight separation of its tail boom while in cruise flight near Kalea, Hawaii. The pilot and two passengers sustained serious injuries, while three other passengers had minor injuries. The helicopter was substantially damaged during the crash. The US NTSB determined that the upper-left tail boom attachment hardware was not installed, leaving only three of four attachment points connected. Wreckage markings indicated that the bolt had been present at one point but had fallen out, resulting in progressive fatigue cracking. The NTSB requested immediate action from the US FAA and Transport Canada in the form of an urgent airworthiness directive.

Specifications (Bell 407)

See also

References

Further reading
  (El Chapo bought a Bell 407 helicopter on the advice of his personal pilot.)

External links

 Bell 407GXP page on BellHelicopter.com site
 

407
1990s United States helicopters
1990s United States civil utility aircraft
1990s Canadian helicopters
1990s Canadian civil utility aircraft
Single-turbine helicopters
Aircraft first flown in 1995